Manina Vlizianon is an Aromanian (Vlach) village in Xiromero municipality, Greece. The 2011 census recorded 170 residents in the village. The community of Manina Vlizianon is a part of the community of Strongylovouni.

History
Manina Vlizianon, together with the other Vlach settlements of Aetolia-Acarnania,  was created in the midst of the 19th century, by people that fled the village of Bitsikopoulo, in Epirus, after a string of assaults by Turkish and Albanian bandits.

See also
 List of settlements in Aetolia-Acarnania

References

Populated places in Aetolia-Acarnania
Aromanian settlements in Greece